Terms related to cannabis include:

0–9

A

B

C

D

E

F

G

H

I

J

K

L

M

N

O

P

R

S

T

U

V

W

X

Y

Z 

Brand of rolling papers made famous by the Afroman song "Crazy Rap"

See also

 List of anti-cannabis organizations
 List of cannabis companies
 List of cannabis-related lists
 List of cannabis rights leaders
 List of cannabis rights organizations
 List of names for cannabis
 List of names for cannabis strains
 List of slang names for cannabis

References

Sources

External links
Wiktionary Appendix of Cannabis Slang

 
Cannabis-related lists
 
Cannabis
Cannabis
Wikipedia glossaries using description lists